
Gmina Podedwórze is a rural gmina (administrative district) in Parczew County, Lublin Voivodeship, in eastern Poland.

Neighbouring gminas
Gmina Podedwórze is bordered by the gminas of Dębowa Kłoda, Jabłoń, Sosnówka, Wisznice and Wyryki.

Villages
The gmina contains the following villages having the status of sołectwo: Antopol, Bojary, Grabówka, Hołowno, Kaniuki, Mosty, Niecielin, Opole, Podedwórze, Rusiły and Zaliszcze.

References

Polish official population figures 2006

Podedworze
Parczew County